Shishan station may refer to:

 Shishan railway station, a railway station in Foshan, Guangdong Province, China
 Shishan station (Foshan Metro), a metro station currently under construction on Line 3 of Foshan Metro in Foshan, Guangdong Province, China
 Shishan station (Ningbo Rail Transit), a metro station on the Yinfeng line of the Ningbo Rail Transit in Ningbo, Zhejiang Province, China

See also
Shizishan station (disambiguation)